Bohuslav Balcar (1943 – 2017)  was a Czech mathematician. He was a senior researcher at the Center for Theoretical Study (CTS), and a professor at Charles University in Prague. His research interests were mainly related to foundations of mathematics.

Balcar received his Ph.D. in 1966 from Charles University. His Ph.D. supervisor was Petr Vopěnka.

References

External links
 Balcar's bio at CTS

2017 deaths
1943 births
20th-century Czech mathematicians
21st-century Czech mathematicians
Set theorists
Czechoslovak mathematicians
Charles University alumni
Academic staff of Charles University